André Ghem and Marco Trungelliti won the title, defeating Facundo Bagnis and Pablo Galdón 6–1, 6–2 in the final.

Seeds

Draw

Draw

References
 Main Draw

SDA Tennis Open - Doubles
2012 Doubles